Chapin Park Historic District is a national historic district located at South Bend, St. Joseph County, Indiana.  It encompasses 260 contributing buildings and 3 contributing sites immediately north of downtown South Bend. Most of its development occurred between about 1890 and 1910 on land formerly comprising the estate of Horatio Chapin, an early settler of South Bend. The neighborhood includes examples of Second Empire, Queen Anne, and Gothic Revival style architecture. Notable buildings include the Horatio Chapin House (1857, 1891), Judge Andrew Anderson House (1875, 1905), Hodson's Castle (1888), South Bend Civic Theater (1898), YMCA (1928), and Christian Science Church (1916).

It was listed on the National Register of Historic Places in 1982.

References

Historic districts on the National Register of Historic Places in Indiana
Second Empire architecture in Indiana
Queen Anne architecture in Indiana
Gothic Revival architecture in Indiana
Historic districts in South Bend, Indiana
National Register of Historic Places in St. Joseph County, Indiana